The Goose and the Gander is a 1935 American romantic comedy film directed by Alfred E. Green and starring Kay Francis, George Brent and Genevieve Tobin. A woman finds out her ex-husband's new wife is cheating on him and decides to expose her.

Cast
 Kay Francis as Georgiana
 George Brent as Bob McNear
 Genevieve Tobin as Betty
 John Eldredge as Lawrence
 Claire Dodd as Connie
 Ralph Forbes as Ralph Summers
 Helen Lowell as Aunt Julia
 Spencer Charters as Winkelsteinberger
 William Austin as Arthur Summers
 Eddie Shubert as Sweeney
 Charles Coleman as Jones
 Olive Jones as Miriam Brent
 Bill Elliott as Teddy (credited as Gordon Elliott)
 John Sheehan as Murphy
 Wade Boteler as Sprague

References

External links
 
 
 
 

American romantic comedy films
American black-and-white films
Films directed by Alfred E. Green
Warner Bros. films
1935 romantic comedy films
1935 films
1930s American films